Douglass Crothers  (November 16, 1859 – March 29, 1907), was a Major League Baseball pitcher. He played for the Kansas City Cowboys of the Union Association in 1884 and the New York Metropolitans of the American Association in 1885. He played in the minor leagues through 1892.

External links

1859 births
1907 deaths
Major League Baseball pitchers
Baseball players from Mississippi
Kansas City Cowboys (UA) players
New York Metropolitans players
19th-century baseball players
Memphis Browns players
Syracuse Stars (minor league baseball) players
Hamilton Hams players
Dallas Hams players
Evansville Hoosiers players
Dallas Tigers players
Memphis Reds players